A Day Without Rain is the fifth studio album by the Irish singer-songwriter Enya, released on 20 November 2000 by WEA. Following a promotional tour in support of her compilation album Paint the Sky with Stars (1997), Enya took a short break before she resumed writing and recording a new album in 1998 with her usual recording partners, producer and arranger Nicky Ryan and his wife, lyricist Roma Ryan. In a musical departure from her previous albums, Enya incorporates a string section on the record.

A Day Without Rain received mixed reviews from critics; some felt it too derivative of Enya's previous albums whilst others complimented the minimal use of overdubbing that her sound had become known for. It was a commercial success peaking at No. 6 in the United Kingdom and initially, No. 17 on the Billboard 200 in the United States. Following the 11 September 2001 attacks, sales of the album and its lead single, "Only Time", skyrocketed after it was used by several radio and television networks in their coverage and aftermath of the attacks. As a result, "Only Time" climbed to No. 10 on the Billboard Hot 100 singles chart and A Day Without Rain reached a new peak on the Billboard 200 at No. 2. It became the fifth highest selling album of 2001 in the United States, and the best selling new age album in history with an estimated 16 million copies sold worldwide. It remains Enya's highest selling album of her career. To promote the album, Enya made several interviews and televised performances, including the 2001 World Music Awards. In 2002, the album won Enya her third Grammy Award for Best New Age Album.

Recording and music
Following a promotional tour in support of her compilation album Paint the Sky with Stars (1997), Enya took a short break before she resumed writing and recording a new studio album in 1998 with her usual recording partners, lyricist Roma Ryan and producer and arranger Nicky Ryan. Recording took place at Aigle Studio in the Ryans' home in Killiney, County Dublin. Enya felt the need to work at a more leisurely pace for A Day Without Rain than working on her previous studio album, The Memory of Trees (1995), making a conscious effort to record for five days a week instead of seven, and take the weekends off. The reduction in her work schedule made her feel happier as a result.

Enya produced A Day Without Rain in a similar way to her previous albums. She first spends time alone developing melodies and outlines of songs on the piano. These would then be presented to the Ryans; "I'm quite anxious at this point", she said, "because it really is an act of laying your soul bare". While Roma starts to write lyrics to the melodies, Enya and Nicky will work in the studio to develop them into completed arrangements. Working without a deadline from her record label or a set timeline, Enya felt the project was complete after two years, feeling it was time to "step out of the studio ... time for it to have its life out in the world".

Songs
During the making of the album, Enya found she was questioning herself about her life and started to answer these questions in the new material she was writing. She compared the album to reading her own diary. "Like in 'Pilgrim'," she said, "I was asking myself: So many years have passed, am I happy with the way I'm working? And my answer is that I wouldn't change anything. I really love what I do." "Flora's Secret" is a song that makes reference to Flora, the Roman mythological goddess of flowers. Enya and Roma incorporated some of Enya's experiences from her own love life on "Only Time" and "Fallen Embers". The former alludes to the difficulties and pressures of finding "the perfect love", which Enya has found difficult throughout her career due to her private lifestyle and that her past relationships were not the right ones. A Day Without Rain features a greater use of strings than previous albums, something that was not a conscious effort. The three work by trying any possible idea with the music, and they stick with elements that give the greatest result creatively. Most of the songs on the album were written in the major key, as Enya believed it helped to create a more positive and uplifting mood to the music.

A Day Without Rain opens with an instrumental title track, which Enya had also done on her previous four studio albums. It was named after the high amount of rainfall over Ireland in the course of a year. After one particular stretch of consistent rain over a few days the sun came out, which inspired Enya to write it. She described its meaning as "the mood of a particularly peaceful day". It was planned for the track to be a song and Roma had prepared an incomplete set of lyrics for it, but as the arrangement developed it was decided for it to remain instrumental.
Enya gave permission for "Only Time" to be included in the soundtrack to the romantic film Sweet November (2001) where one of the lead characters finds out they are dying of cancer. She agreed in connection with the death of Irish musician Frankie Kennedy, co-founder of the Celtic group Altan with his wife Mairéad Ní Mhaonaigh, from bone cancer in 1994. Enya played synthesiser on their album Ceol Aduaidh (1983), and found Kennedy's death particularly sad.

"The First of Autumn" is an instrumental piece that gained inspiration from a poem Roma had written as part of a collection of poems about the seasons. Among them was a haiku that was first printed in the liner notes to Enya's limited edition box set Only Time – The Collection (2002). Enya singled out "Fallen Embers" as her favourite track on A Day Without Rain. She knew it was a particularly strong track when she presented it to Roma, who understood the emotion that she tried to put across musically. After Roma finished its lyrics, Enya recalled, "It was so moving to actually sing them". The Japanese edition of the album includes "Isobella", a song that Roma described as a song for "a spirit child. One whom both Enya and myself experienced yet know nothing about", and named it Isobella.

Release
A Day Without Rain received a launch party at Somerset House in London on 19 October 2000, where guests received a promotional CD of the album containing a personal organiser and a handmade frontispiece. It was released in the UK on 20 November 2000 on Warner Music. Its North American release followed on 21 November on Reprise Records. In the US, Reprise promoted A Day Without Rain through a campaign that involved E-cards and Amazon.com pages with 30-second snippets of "Only Time", exclusive displays offered at select retail stores, and a dedicated section of the label's web page to the album. It went on to reach, before the 11 September attacks, an initial peak of No. 17 on the US Billboard 200 in December 2000 and No. 6 on the UK Albums Chart.

"Only Time" was released as the album's lead single. A promotional edition was shipped to Adult Contemporary radio stations, and the song premiered on the Delilah radio show on 24 October 2000. Its music video, directed by Graham Fink, was distributed to various music television networks from 31 October 2000. The song gained nationwide radio airplay following its use in an episode of the drama series Providence and the soundtrack to Sweet November (2001). By October 2001, the single had spent 43 weeks at No. 1 on the Billboard New Age chart. The song, in April 2001, was remixed without authorisation with added electronic dance beats and keyboards by the Swiss American Federation (S.A.F.), a group formed of Los Angeles-based radio DJ and producer Christian Burkholder, a longtime Enya fan, and Marc Dold. The song received radio airplay in Los Angeles before it spread to stations across the country. When the song aired on WHTZ in New York City in June, other stations followed suit, which led to Burkholder being contacted by Nicky and Enya, who approved his remix. The second single released from A Day Without Rain, "Wild Child", was released in December 2001. It charted on the Billboard Adult Contemporary chart with a peak of No. 12. Its B-side, "Midnight Blue", is originally an instrumental that was extended with added vocals. It was then renamed as the title track for Enya's album And Winter Came... (2008).

In 2001, the album won Best International Pop Albums of the Year at the Japan Gold Disc Awards. In 2002, it won a Grammy Award for Best New Age Album.

9/11 aftermath
Following the 11 September 2001 attacks, "Only Time" was used in radio and television coverage of the disaster, which led to increased sales and radio airplay of the single and A Day Without Rain, to the point of both records surpassing their initial peak on the US charts. CNN and ABC News, among other networks, played the song with "Fallen Embers" as backdrops of footage of the victims. Its position on the Billboard 200 climbed from No. 20 prior to the attacks to its all-time peak of No. 2, driven by the increased audience exposure of "Only Time". In the same month, "Only Time" reached No. 1 on the Billboard Adult Contemporary chart after it already spent 33 weeks on the chart, breaking a seven-year-old record for the longest climb to the top position in the chart's history. In November 2001, the single climbed to its peak of No. 10 on the Billboard Hot 100 chart, making it Enya's highest-charting single in the US. From October 2001 to January 2002, over 3 million RIAA-certified units of A Day Without Rain were sold in the US alone, which included a peak of one million copies sold in 19 days.

"Only Time" gained further exposure following its use as a sound bed for promos of the comedy series Friends on the first five episodes of the eighth season. Following the media response and increased sales of Enya's records, "Only Time" was reissued as a maxi-CD on 20 November 2001 containing the S.A.F remix and original version, with earnings from its sales donated to the Uniform Firefighters Association's Widows' and Children's Fund in aid of families of fire fighters involved in the attack rescue operations.

A Day Without Rain became the eight highest selling album worldwide in 2001, selling 6.6 million copies.
 It also was the top selling new age album of the 2000s in the US, according to Nielsen SoundScan. It remains Enya's highest selling album of her career with a total of 16 million copies sold worldwide.

Critical reception

A Day Without Rain received mixed reviews from music critics. In a review for Dallas Morning News, Mario Tarradell gave a rating of "B+". He thought the album was worth the five-year wait since The Memory of Trees and is "another lovely piece of work" from Enya. The title track is "an elegant piano melody" that is followed by "dark-to-light, chaos-to-peace progression" for the rest of the album. "Lazy Days", he thought, was "an engulfing pop song filled with swooshing flourishes that one-ups the hooky, wall-of-sound pull" of Enya's past singles "Orinoco Flow" and "Caribbean Blue". Tarradell finalises with the album is "quintessential Enya". Fiona Shepherd reviewed the album for The Scotsman and was more critical, writing Enya continues a "policy of releasing the same album over and over again using a different title and cover" with "drab Celtic moods". She thought the album was not on par with her "earlier epic stuff". A critical review appeared from Gavin Martin of The Mirror, who thought that the title track and "Only Time" would please her fans, but the album "still sounds like undistinguished new age fodder ... The rest of us can go back to watching paint dry."

R.S. Murthi for New Straits Times gave a rating of two-and-a-half stars out of five for Enya's performance and three out of five for the album's sound quality. He wrote that the album is a "ho-hum New Age effort" with "pretty melodies" but, on the other hand, its "dense textures conceal a compositional shallowness". He deemed some of the track titles "pompous" but the more successful songs, such as "Deora Ar Mo Chroi", are so due to their traditional Celtic elements rather than Enya's own compositions. Stephen Thompson of The A.V. Club found it too derivative of Enya's previous albums, which he found far superior to A Day Without Rain. In his review for The Village Voice, Robert Christgau panned the album as nonsense, "goopier, more simplistic" than Watermark (1988).

Steve Morse welcomed the album in a report for The Boston Globe. He thought the album is "arguably her best work because there is more emphasis on her gorgeous soprano lead vocals rather than the lush, multitracked harmony vocals". Billboard complimented the album's production, writing the more experimental songs like "Only Time" and "Lazy Days" "not only freshen a musical formula that still works extremely well but also leave the listener happily curious about Enya's next move". Rolling Stone remarked that the album sounded too similar to her previous releases and thought a change in musical direction after Paint the Sky with Stars would have been better. Her "skill at ephemeral sonic watercolors has grown wearisome, like a relative who tells the same stories every holiday." In The Baltimore Sun, J. D. Considine thought the album belonged in "the same lush, contemplative vein" as Enya's previous albums, which he thought were formed of "pretty but unconnected" tracks. A Day Without Rain, however, was more of a unified album that compared to "a suite instead of a pop album". "One by One", he thought, "conveys all the qualities of a pop hit without succumbing to the typical transience of a Top-40 favorite". People recommended the "masterful" album for a "rainy day" because of Enya's characteristic sound and tranquil mood.

Track listing
All music by Enya, all lyrics by Roma Ryan except "Deora Ar Mo Chroí" adapted into Irish lyrics by Enya from Roma Ryan's poem in English. All songs produced by Nicky Ryan.

("The First of Autumn" was omitted from the US edition)

("Isobella" replaced "The First of Autumn" on the Japanese edition)

Personnel
Credits adapted from the album's 2000 liner notes.

Music
Enya – lead vocals, backing vocals, piano, keyboard, violin, cello, percussion, Irish adaptation
Wired Strings – additional strings

Production
Enya – arrangement, mixing
Nicky Ryan – production, arrangement, engineering, mixing
Stylorouge – design, art direction
Sheila Rock – front cover photography, other photography
Simon Fowler – photography
The Handsome Foundation – costume design
Dick Beetham – mastering at 360 Mastering

Charts

Weekly charts

Year-end charts

All-time charts

Certifications

Release history

References

External links

Enya albums
2000 albums
Grammy Award for Best New Age Album
Reprise Records albums
Warner Music Group albums